Darreh Veyan or Darreh Vian may refer to:
 Darreh Vian, Divandarreh
 Darreh Veyan-e Olya, Kamyaran County
 Darreh Veyan-e Sofla, Kamyaran County
 Darreh Veyan-e Sheykh, Saqqez County
 Darreh Vian-e Khowshkeh, Saqqez County